Secret Lives! of the Freemasons  or alternatively "Secret Lives!"  was a band from Asheville, North Carolina. They formed in Asheville in 2003 after the breakup of two other local bands, A Kiss Before Dying and Throwing Myself. In 2004 the group signed with Astro Magnetics (partly owned by Geoff Rickly of Thursday), who released their 2005 full-length; the group left the label in June 2007, and the next month signed with Victory Records. They have toured nationally with such groups as He Is Legend, Scary Kids Scaring Kids, The Sleeping and Envy On the Coast.

Members
Current
 Cliff Brien Worsham - lead vocals, keys
 Jim Debardi - guitar, keys, vocals
 Tucker Ensley - guitar
 Josh Carden - bass
 Travis Moss - drums

Past
 Justin Elrod - guitar, vocals

Discography
 The Cut and Thrust of Clear Thinking (Divisional Media, EP, 2004)
 This Was Built To Make You Dance (Astro Magnetics, 2005)
    1. Make Like A Door And Shut Up
    2. It Only Took A Whisper
    3. A Song Of Hope
    4. Glazed Over Eyes Never Lie
    5. To The Barricades!
    6. This Was Built To Make You Dance
    7. If It Weren't For Pick Pockets, I'd Have No Sex Life
    8. And Then A Hurricane
    9. I Fought The Broad (And The Broad Won)
    10. How To Beat A Dead Horse
    11. Less Tude, More Dude
    12. Burial At Sea
    13. Rather Touched Than Loved

 Weekend Warriors (Victory Records, February 19, 2008)
    1. Chug And Leave
    2. Mascara
    3. Dirty Laundry
    4. The New Whack
    5. Feels Like Home
    6. Why We Run
    7. Airplanes
    8. There's Wolves Out There
    9. Painting Monsters
    10. The Death Of...
    11. Xanax
    12. Life Begins At 40oz.

Music videos
 It Only Took A Whisper
 Life Begins At 40 oz.

References

External links
Secret Lives of the Freemasons on Myspace
Victory Records webpage

American pop music groups
American post-hardcore musical groups
Musical groups from Asheville, North Carolina
Victory Records artists